

National newspapers

1 to 4 issues a week 

 Argumenty i Fakty (Аргументы и Факты), weekly
 Argumenty Nedeli (Аргументы недели), weekly
 Krasnaya Zvezda (Красная Звезда), 3 issues a week
 Kultura (Культура), weekly
 Literaturnaya Gazeta (Литературная газета), weekly
 Novaya Gazeta (Новая газета), 3 issues a week, suspended publication after the start of the 2022 Russian invasion of Ukraine
 Pravda (Правда), 3 issue a week
 Zhizn (Жизнь), weekly

Detailed list

See also
 History of Russian journalism
 List of newspapers in Ukraine
 Media of Russia
 TASS, known now as ITAR-TASS, News agency
 RIA Novosti, News agency
 Interfax, News agency

References

External links
 A Complete Visual Directory of Russian National and Regional Newspapers
 List of Russian newspapers and online news sites in English
 Russian information resource about industry and fuel and energy complex

Further reading
 

Russia

Newspapers